Brockius albigenys, the Whitecheek blenny, is a species of labrisomid blenny native to reefs of the Caribbean Sea.

References

albigenys
Fish of the Caribbean
Fish described in 1928
Taxa named by William Beebe
Taxa named by John Tee-Van